Soběslav is a town in Tábor District in the South Bohemian Region of the Czech Republic. It has about 6,800 inhabitants. The historical town centre is well preserved and is protected by law as an urban monument zone.

Administrative parts

The town is made up of town parts of Soběslav I–III and villages of Chlebov and Nedvědice.

Geography
It lies on the border between the Třeboň Basin and the Tábor Uplands.

The town is situated on the river Lužnice. There are several ponds in the area. The Nový pond with its surroundings is protected as the Nový rybník u Soběslavi Nature Monument.

History

The first written mention of Soběslav is from 1293 when the castle and surrounding areas belonged to the Rosenberg family. In obtained towns rights in 1390. Four years later was the King Wenceslaus IV imprisoned in a local castle.

In the 16th century, Soběslav was the seat of Peter Vok of Rosenberg and one of the most important towns of the Rosenbergs estate. It represented the economic centre of southern Bohemia with ties to Bavaria and Austria. This most important stage in the history of the town is evident in numerous historic buildings in the town to this day.

The town was burned twice during the Hussite Wars. At the end of 19th century, the town was connected by a railroad with Prague and České Budějovice.

Demographics

Transport
The D3 motorway runs next to the town.

There is a small civil airport on the southern edge of the town.

Sights

The historical part of the town is protected as an urban monument zone. The Church of Saint Vitus is a Gothic building from 1375, founded by Oldřich I of Rosenberg. In the 15th–18th centuries it was modified, but retained its Gothic character.

The Soběslav Castle is known for its well-preserved cylindrical tower Hláska, which is a landmark of the town. The castle fell into disrepair in the 1980s. Its northern wing was reconstructed in 2010 and today it houses the town library.

The parish Church of Saints Peter and Paul is a landmark of the town square. An old church was completely rebuilt in the late Gothic style in 1493–1517.

There are two museums in the town: Smrčka's House (an ethnographic museum in the only preserved Renaissance house in the town) and Rosenberg House (museum with nature-related expositions).

Nearby the town border there is a forest called Svákov with an eponymous observation tower, small Chapel of Our Lady of Sorrows, and remnants of an old Slavic gord.

Notable people
František Josef Studnička (1836–1903), mathematician, astronomer and Czech science life organizer 
Otakar Ostrčil (1879–1935), pedagogue, composer and conductor; visited regularly the town and composed here

Twin towns – sister cities

Soběslav is twinned with:
 Sabinov, Slovakia

References

External links

Cities and towns in the Czech Republic
Populated places in Tábor District